The 1971 Houston Cougars football team represented the University of Houston during the 1971 NCAA University Division football season. The Cougars, coached by Bill Yeoman in his tenth season, compiled a 9–3 record, and outscored their opponents by a total of 339 to 199.  Houston finished ranked No. 17 in the AP Poll after a loss to Colorado in the Astro-Bluebonnet Bowl.

Schedule

Roster

References

Houston
Houston Cougars football seasons
Houston Cougars football